Economic Theory is a peer-reviewed academic journal that focuses on theoretical economics, particularly social choice, general equilibrium theory, and game theory.  Mathematically rigorous articles are also published in the fields of experimental economics, public economics, international economics, development economics, and industrial organisation.

The journal is the official journal of the Society for the Advancement of Economic Theory.  Both the society and the journal were founded by Charalambos D. Aliprantis, David Cass, Douglas Gale, Mukul Majumdar, Edward C. Prescott, Nicholas C. Yannelis, and Yves Younes.

External links
 

Economics journals
Publications established in 1991
Monthly journals
English-language journals
Springer Science+Business Media academic journals